The 2014 European Superstock 600 Championship was the tenth season of the European Superstock 600 Championship. The season was contested over seven rounds, beginning on 12 April at Motorland Aragón in Spain, and concluding on 4 October at Circuit de Nevers Magny-Cours in France.

The championship was comfortably won by Italian rider Marco Faccani, who won five of the seven races for the San Carlo Team Italia. He finished 43 points clear of his closest rival Wayne Tessels, riding for his eponymous Wayne Racing Team. Third place was taken by Faccani's team-mate Andrea Tucci, 10 points behind Tessels. Niki Tuuli, who finished fourth in the championship, and Toprak Razgatlıoğlu – making an appearance as a wildcard at Magny-Cours – were the only other riders to win races during the season.

Entry list
A total of 35 riders were entered for the 2014 season, including female rider Rebecca Bianchi. A number of front runners moved on to pastures new for 2014; 2013 champion Franco Morbidelli moved into the Moto2 World Championship, title contenders Alessandro Nocco, Christian Gamarino and Tony Coveña all progressed to the Supersport World Championship and Bastien Chesaux left to ride in the FIM CEV International Moto2 Championship. This left the door open for many new riders to fight for podiums and victories.

Championship standings

References

External links

European Superstock 600 Championship seasons
European Superstock 600 Championship
Superstock 600 Championship